The Arghun dynasty (Sindhi: ارغونن جي سلطنت) was a dynasty of either Mongol, Turkic or Turco-Mongol ethnicity, who ruled over the area between Southern Afghanistan and Sindh from the late 15th century to the early 16th century. The Arghuns claimed their descent and name from Ilkhanid-Mongol Arghun Khan. Arghun rule can be divided into two branches: the Arghun branch of Dhu'l-Nun Beg Arghun that ruled until 1554, and the Tarkhan branch of Muhammad 'Isa Tarkhan that ruled until 1591.

Arghun governors of Kandahar

In the late 15th century, the Timurid sultan of Herat, Husayn Bayqarah, appointed Dhu'l-Nun Beg Arghun as governor of Kandahar. Dhu'l-Nun Beg soon began to ignore the authority of the central government in Herat and in around 1479 he began expanding in the direction of Baluchistan, taking over Pishin, Shal and Mastung. In 1485 his sons Shah Beg Arghun and Muhammad Mukim Khan also seized Sibi from the Samma dynasty of Sindh, although this gain was only temporary.

In 1497, Dhu'l-Nun Beg threw his support behind the revolt of Husayn Bayqarah's son Badi' al-Zaman against his father. Dhu'l-Nun Beg, who married off his daughter to Badi' al-Zaman, subsequently gained a prominent position in the latter's government when the Timurid succeeded Husayn Bayqarah in Herat in 1506. Unfortunately for them, the Uzbeks under Muhammad Shaybani invaded Khorasan shortly after Badi' al-Zaman's ascension. In 1507 Dhu'l-Nun Beg was killed in battle against the Uzbeks and succeeded by his sons Shah Beg and Mukim.

Wars with Babur
The Arghuns ultimately lost control of their portion of Afghanistan to the Timurid prince Babur, who had been expelled from Transoxiana by the Uzbeks and had made his way south to Husayn Bayqarah's kingdom. In 1501/1502 Mukim had peacefully gained the submission of Kabul, which was in chaos after the death of its ruler Ulugh Beg II. This was contested by Babur, who besieged and took the city in 1504; Mukim fell back to Kandahar.

After Dhu'l-Nun Beg's death Babur decided that as long as Shah Beg and Mukim remained in Kandahar they would remain a threat to them. In 1507 or 1508 he attacked them, but the brothers saved their position by agreeing to submit to the Uzbek Muhammad Shaybani. In the following years Babur spent his time fighting against the Uzbeks in an attempt to regain Samarkand, giving Shah Beg and Mukim a degree of respite.

Shah Beg Arghun, however, seems to have realized that in the long term it would be impossible to hold Kandahar against Babur. In 1520, in the hopes of establishing a new power base, he invaded Sindh, where the Samma dynasty was struggling under Jam Feroz. Shah Beg defeated Jam Feroz's army and proceeded to sack Thatta. The two sides agreed to a peace, where Shah Beg gained the upper half of Sindh (Thatta) while the Sammas retained the lower half (Bukkur). Jam Feroz almost immediately broke this agreement, but was defeated by Shah Beg and forced to flee to Gujarat. This marked the end of Samma rule in Sindh, as Shah Beg gained control of the whole region.

Arghun dynasty of Sindh

Arghun branch
In 1522 Babur took Kandahar after a drawn-out siege and annexed it. Following this, Shah Beg Arghun made Bukkur (Lower Sindh) his official capital. He died in 1524 and his son Shah Husayn succeeded him. Shah Husayn had the Khutba read in Babur's name and attacked Multan, capital of the Langah Sultanate, probably at Babur's insistence. Multan fell in 1528 after an extended siege and Shah Husayn appointed a governor of the city. Shortly after Shah Husayn departed Multan for Thatta, however, the governor was thrown out of the city. The rebels administered Multan for a time independently, but soon afterward submitted to the Mughal Empire, which had been founded by Babur after his capture of Delhi in 1526.

In 1540 Shah Husayn had to deal with the arrival of Babur's successor Humayun, who had been expelled from medieval India by Sher Shah Suri. Humayun implored Shah Husayn to provide assistance in fighting against Sher Shah Suri, but was unable to convince him to do so. Sometime after this Humayun later attempted to wrest Sindh from Shah Husayn, but the latter was able to force a stalemate. The Mughal Emperor eventually agreed to leave Sindh and made his way to Kandahar in 1543.

Shah Husayn became increasingly incapable of ruling as he approached the end of his life. Because of this, the nobles of Sindh decided to elect Mirza Muhammad 'Isa Tarkhan, who was a member of a senior branch of the Arghuns, as their ruler in 1554. Shah Husayn was set aside and died childless in 1556.

Tarkhan branch

During the civil war between Shah Husayn and Muhammad 'Isa Tarkhan, the latter had sent a request for the help to the Portuguese at Bassein. A 700-man force under the command of Pedro Barreto Rolim sailed up to Thatta in 1555, only to find that Muhammad 'Isa Tarkhan had already won the conflict and there was no need for their assistance. Furious at the governor of Thatta's refusal to pay them, the Portuguese sacked the defenseless city and killed several thousand people.

Muhammad 'Isa Tarkhan was soon forced to deal with a rival claimant, Sultan Mahmud Kokaltash reverently referred to as Sultan Mahmud Koka. He was eventually compelled to make peace with Sultan Mahmud; the two agreed that Muhammad 'Isa Tarkhan would keep lower Sindh, with his capital at Thatta, while Sultan Mahmud would rule upper Sindh from Bakhar. In 1567 Muhammad 'Isa Tarkhan died and was succeeded by his son Muhammad Baqi. During the latter's reign upper Sindh was annexed by the Mughal Emperor Akbar in 1573.

Mirza Muhammad Baqi committed suicide in 1585, and was succeeded by his son Mirza Jani Beg. In 1591 Akbar sent an army to conquer lower Sindh. Jani Beg put up a resistance but was defeated by the Mughal forces and his principality was annexed. In 1599 he died of delirium tremens.

External links

|-

|-

See also
List of Sunni Muslim dynasties
 List of Monarchs of Sindh

Notes

References

Bosworth, Clifford Edmund. The New Islamic Dynasties: A Chronological and Genealogical Manual. New York: Columbia University Press, 1996. 
Bosworth, Clifford Edmund. "Kabul." The Encyclopedia of Islam, Volume IV. New ed. Leiden: E. J. Brill, 1978. 
Davies, C. Collin. "Arghun." The Encyclopedia of Islam, Volume I. New ed. Leiden: E. J. Brill, 1960. 
Memoirs of Zehīr-ed-dīn Muhammed Bābur, Emperor of Hindustan. Trans. John Leyden & William Erskine. Annotated and edited by Lucas King. London: Longman, Rees, Orme, Brown, & Green, 1826.
Report of the Western Circle, 1898. 20 January 2005. Accessed 2 May 2008.

Mongol dynasties
Dynasties of Afghanistan
Dynasties of Pakistan
History of Sindh
Sunni dynasties
1520 establishments in Asia